Peter Schechter (born 1959) is an American political consultant and the executive producer and host of Altamar, a foreign policy podcast. Until June 2017, he was the Atlantic Council's Senior Vice President for Strategic Initiatives and the founding director of the Adrienne Arsht Latin America Center, a Washington-based think tank launched in October 2013 to study the trends transforming Latin America.

Born in 1959 in Rome, Schechter was raised in Italy, Bolivia, and Venezuela. He has a Master's from the Johns Hopkins’ Paul H. Nitze School of Advanced International Studies. He is fluent in six languages: English, Spanish, Italian, Portuguese, French, and German.

Biography 
From 1987 to 1992, Schechter worked as a political consultant for the Sawyer Miller Group. In 1993, he became a founding partner of Chlopak, Leonard, Schechter and Associates, a Washington, DC-based public relations company.

According to Foreign Agents Registration filings with the US Department of Justice, the firm received over $292,000 in 2009 to boost the image of the interim government of Honduras in the US.

Schechter is an adjunct professor at George Washington University in DC and a visiting professor at Ben Gurion University’s Faculty of Business and Management. He also serves on BGU's Board of Governors.

Schechter is also a goat farmer in Virginia, co-owner with chef José Andrés of five successful Washington restaurants (including prize-winning Jaleo and Zaytinya), co-proprietor of Agur Winery in Israel, and an author.

Schechter published his first novel, Point of Entry, in 2006. The Washington Post called it "fast moving". The Chicago Tribune said it is "as good as this kind of writing gets". The St. Louis Post Dispatch said the plot is "why-didn't I think-of-that-clever." Newsweek called it "a rip-roaring novel about terrorism, nuclear plots and presidential dating." The Boston Globe declared it "entertaining". His second book, Pipeline, was published in 2009.

References

External links 
 Altamar's official website 
 Washington Post article on Peter Schechter
 Peter Schechter's page at HarperCollins

1959 births
Living people
American thriller writers
Jewish American writers
American political consultants
Communications consultants
20th-century Italian Jews
American male novelists
Paul H. Nitze School of Advanced International Studies alumni
Atlantic Council
Italian emigrants to the United States
21st-century American Jews